Fluorone is a heterocyclic chemical compound.  It forms the core structure for various chemicals, most notably fluorone dyes, including fluorescein, erythrosine and rhodamine.  It is an isomer of xanthone, sometimes referred to as an isoxanthone.

See also 
 Xanthene

References